Judith Freeman is an American novelist, frequently dealing with Western and Mormon themes. She has lived with her husband, artist-photographer Anthony Hernandez, in the Rampart District of Los Angeles since 1986.

Bibliography

Novels
 "Family Attractions" (Short Stories) (1988)
 The Chinchilla Farm (1989)
 Set For Life (1991)
 A Desert of Pure Feeling (1996)
 Red Water (2002)
 MacArthur Park (2021)

Nonfiction
 The Long Embrace: Raymond Chandler and The Woman He Loved (2007)
 The Latter Days: A Memoir (2016)

References

External links
 Freeman on NPR's Fresh Air discussing The Long Embrace
 Review of Red Water at The New Yorker
 Comparison of Red Water to other novels about the Mountain Meadows Massacre at A Motley Vision
 "The Mormon Chronicles: A Meditation in Four Parts" by Judith Freeman

20th-century American novelists
21st-century American novelists
American women novelists
Living people
20th-century American women writers
21st-century American women writers
Year of birth missing (living people)